Tennessee City (also Gillem, Gillems Station) is an unincorporated community in Dickson County, Tennessee, United States.

Notes

Unincorporated communities in Dickson County, Tennessee
Unincorporated communities in Tennessee